Josef Kaltenbrunner (22 January 1888 – 1951) was an Austrian international footballer. He competed at the 1912 Summer Olympics.

References

1888 births
1951 deaths
Association football goalkeepers
Austrian footballers
Austria international footballers
Olympic footballers of Austria
Footballers at the 1912 Summer Olympics
SK Rapid Wien players
Place of birth missing